are the current and historical international relations between Brazil and Japan. The diplomatic relations were officially established on 5 November 1895 with the Treaty of Friendship, Commerce and Navigation signed in Paris. Early relations were dominated by the Japanese immigration issues. The total number of Japanese immigrants reached 190,000 in the pre-World War II period. Now, more than 2 million Brazilians are of Japanese descent, making Brazil host to the largest Japanese community outside Japan. At the same time, Japan is host to the third largest Brazilian population, most being of Japanese origin. Both nations are members of the G4 nations, G20 and World Trade Organization.

History

First contact between Brazil and Japan was through Portuguese explorers who first arrived to Japan in 1543 and got foreign control of the city of Nagasaki; 43 years after Portugal founded its first colonies in Brazil. From 1543 to 1638, Portugal traded with Japan with stopovers in Brazil along the way, known as the Nanban trade. Many Japanese products were sold in Brazil and, during this time period, Portuguese traders sold Japanese slaves in Brazil. By 1638, Portuguese traders were no longer allowed to trade in Japan, however, trade continued between the Portuguese colony in Macau. Soon afterwards, Japan entered a period of isolation.

In September 1822, Brazil obtained its independence from Portugal. In October 1868, Japan entered the Meiji period and began fostering diplomatic relations with several nations, after decades of isolation. In 1895, Brazil and Japan signed a Treaty of Friendship, Commerce and Navigation. In 1897, diplomatic missions were opened in each nations capitals, respectively. In June 1908, a ship from Japan carrying 790 Japanese migrants arrived to Brazil aboard the Kasato Maru; the first of many Japanese migrants to arrive to Brazil. Between 1908 and 1941, over 190,000 Japanese immigrated to Brazil searching for better opportunities in the South American nation.

During World War II, Brazil broke diplomatic relations with Japan in January 1942 over the Attack on Pearl Harbor and allied itself with the Allies. As a result, thousands of families of Japanese origin in Brazil were arrested or deported as potential spies or collaborators. The Brazilian government also closed hundreds of Japanese schools, seized communications equipment and forced the relocation of Japanese who lived close to the coastline. Many in the Japanese-Brazilian community were tortured, and were forced to step on an image of Emperor Hirohito, who was then considered divine in Japan. Diplomatic relations between both nations were restored in 1952. Between 1953 and 1973, an additional 55,000 Japanese immigrated to Brazil.

In July 1959, Prime Minister Nobusuke Kishi became the first Japanese head of state to visit Brazil. In September 1976, Brazilian President Ernesto Geisel paid an official visit to Japan. Japanese Emperor Akihito visited Brazil in 1997, his third visit to the country (his first and second visit were as Crown Prince in 1967 and 1978, respectively).

In 1990, the Japanese government authorized the legal entry of Japanese and their descendants until the third generation in Japan. Since then, close to 300,000 Japanese-Brazilians have migrated to Japan and form the third-largest immigrant group in Japan, after Chinese and Koreans. In recent years, however, several have returned to Brazil after saving money in Japan to purchase property in Brazil and in 2016, the Brazilian-Japanese community totaled 180,000 members.

In 2015, both nations celebrated 120 years of diplomatic relations.

In June 2019, Brazilian President Jair Bolsonaro took part in G20 summit in Osaka, Japan. On 22 October 2019, President Jair Bolsonaro attended the enthronement ceremony of Japanese Emperor Naruhito at the Imperial Palace in Japanese capital Tokyo.

High-level Visits

Japan to Brazil

Brazil to Japan

Bilateral relations 
Brazil and Japan have signed several bilateral agreements/treaties such as an Agreement on Technical Cooperation (1970); Cooperation Agreement in the field of Science and Technology (1984); Joint Program for Revitalization of Economic Relations (2005) and an Agreement on the facilitation of the issuance of multiple-entry Visas for holders of regular passports (2016).

Brazil has been deeply influenced by Japan, on both an economic and humanitarian plateau, through various third parties such as the International Monetary Fund (IMF), the Official Development Assistance (ODA) or the World Health Organization (WHO), and so on. Japan plays a significant role in fostering friendly relations and improving the climate for diplomatic activities. In order to improve relations, frequent ministerial talks have been held between the two countries. In 2014, the Brazilian president Rousseff stated that with this agreement, both countries will be able to expand high-level political and economic contacts. In the 2016 Japan-Brazil Summit Meeting, the Prime Minister stated that Japan attaches importance to its relationship with Brazil as an important partner with which it shares fundamental values such as liberty, democracy, human rights and the rule of law, and with which it also cooperates in international fora. President Temer replied that Brazil has become a new country, and along with emphasizing Brazil's stability on the political and judicial fronts, he expressed his strong expectations of increased investment in Brazil by Japanese companies. The Japan Bank for International Cooperation (JBIC) sets to support open innovation by providing financing to potential companies that contribute to the improvement of Brazil and promote sustainability.

Apart from direct relations with Brazil, Japan is involved in organizations such as Basic Human Needs (BHN) which makes sure people have the necessities of life. They also contribute to the United Nation Commission on Sustainable Development (CSD) working in Rio de Janeiro to implement the Rio Declaration which intends to spur economic development. The Japanese work with the World Health Organization (WHO) in developing countries to educate people about the HIV virus and to help search for a cure. In addition, to support the protection of the Brazilian Amazon rainforest and combat illegal deforestation, the Japan Bank for International Cooperation (JICA) intends to begin phase two of the project that utilizes satellite images using artificial intelligence to predict where illegal deforestation may happen next.

Trade
In 2015, trade between Brazil and Japan totaled US$8 billion. Brazil's main exports to Japan include: iron ore, meat, non-ferrous metal, chemicals, iron and steel. Japan's main exports to Brazil include: automobiles, automotive parts, motors, metal working machinery. In 2016, Japanese direct investment in Brazil totaled US$1.4 billion. That same year, Japan ranked as the third largest trading partner for Brazil in Asia and the seventh in the world. Several well known multinational Japanese companies such as Daiso, Honda, Sony, Toshiba and Toyota (among others) operate in Brazil. In 2007, Japan Airlines began purchasing Embraer made airplanes for their company.

The two countries are negotiating a free trade agreement, with possible announcement until the end of 2019, following the opening of the South American market, Mercosur.

History 
Before World War II, the arrival of the first Japanese immigrants in Brazil opened stores, selling Japanese goods. The Brazil-Japan trade relations through these merchants amounted £35,933 in imports from Japan in 1913. Goods included ceramics, celluloid, toys, toothbrushes, fans, and buttons. Meanwhile, Brazil exported rock crystal and coffee to Japan totaled £2,931. In 1935 Japan sent a trade mission to Brazil that led to a great expansion of trade between 1936 and 1941, which led Brazilian exports to Japan jumped from £158,098 in 1935 to £1,683,106 in 1936 and £2,122,106 in 1937. After world War II, in 1949 a Japanese trade mission visited Brazil and reached an agreement covering US $35 million of foreign trade payments. In the early 1970s, two major trade missions visited Brazil, which led over 150 Japanese companies open branches in Brazil. Therefore, trade increased rapidly, reaching $2.1 billion in 1974. In the late 1970s, the economic relationship came to a new level, moving to large-scale economic cooperative projects based on agreements between the two governments. However, due to Brazilian debt crisis, the progress of closer economic relations slowed down in 1982. After that, the Brazilians of Japanese descents began to come back to Japan for work and education.

Trade Volume 
Japan and Brazil shares a long term trade relationship. Japan's exports to Brazil have doubled and imports have tripled in decade. The main imports from Brazil is ores slag and ash, cereals, and meat, while the main exports to Brazil are vehicles other than railway, tramway, machinery, and electrical. In 2018, Brazil exported $4.46B to Japan, while Japan exported $4.12B to Brazil.   Though the share of Japan in Brazil's exports and Brazilian imports in Japan has dropped about 1.1%, during the last 23 years the exports of Japan to Brazil have increased at an annualized rate of 1.79%. There is much room for improving bilateral trading relationship to get mutual benefits. Japan and Brazil try to increase the trading relationship through various ways including discussion on trade bloc of meat and a specific trade area in 2018.

Direct Investment 
Japan's foreign direct investment (FDI) in Brazil is increasing since last century and more than 450 Japanese companies are operating in the Brazilian market. The amount of direct investment from Japan in 2018 was $2,203 million. Japanese investment focuses on the manufacturing sector. Brazil occupies the 10th position in the rank of Japan's FDI. To foster the bilateral trade and FDI, the Brazil-Japan Economic Agreement plays the key role.

Public Perception of Relations 
In 2013, due to the Ministry of Foreign Affairs’ commissions, a private surveying agency in Brazil conduct a public opinion poll on the image of Japan in Brazil. Interviews show that 78% of the respondents believed that Japan and Brazil had “friendly” or “rather friendly” relations. In addition, 84% expected an increase of the importance of Japan for Brazil in the future. With regard to Japan's commitment to global issues, Brazilians recognized such areas as "environmental protection" (42%), "sustainable society" (32%) and "support for disaster prevention" (31%).

Resident diplomatic missions
 Brazil has an embassy in Tokyo and consulates-general in Hamamatsu and Nagoya.
 Japan has an embassy in Brasília and consulates-general in Belém, Curitiba, Manaus, Rio de Janeiro, São Paulo and consular offices in Recife and Porto Alegre.

See also
 Brazilians in Japan
 Brazilian schools in Japan
 Japanese Brazilians
 Japanese community of São Paulo
 Japanese School of Manaus

References 

 
Japan
Brazil